Basia on Broadway is a live album by Polish-born singer Basia, released in October 1995 by Sony Music.

Overview
The album consists of 16 songs recorded live at the Neil Simon Theatre in New York City on November 24 & 25, 1994, during Basia's two-week concert run on Broadway – hence the album's subtitle Live at the Neil Simon Theatre. Of these songs, four were originally recorded for Basia's 1987 debut album, Time and Tide ("From Now On", "New Day for You", "Promises", and "Time and Tide"), with seven others from her 1990 release London Warsaw New York ("Copernicus", "Cruising for Bruising", "Baby You're Mine", "Take Him Back Rachel", "Reward", "Until You Come Back to Me", and "Brave New Hope"), and three from her 1994 album The Sweetest Illusion ("Third Time Lucky", "Drunk on Love", and "Yearning"). "Half a Minute" originates from the debut Matt Bianco album Whose Side Are You On? (1984). "Dzień się budzi" (English: "The Day Is Dawning") is a cover of a song popularized in Poland in the 1960s, and is the only track on the album performed in Basia's native Polish. Live versions of "Half a Minute" and "Time and Tide" were released as singles in the UK and Japan, respectively, to promote the album.

Track listing

Personnel
 Basia − lead vocals
 Danny White − keyboards, acoustic piano
 Fayyaz Virji − keyboards, shaker, trombone
 Peter White − guitar, keyboards
 Randy Hope-Taylor − bass
 Richard Bailey − drums
 Karl Van Den Bossche − percussion
 Jay Beckenstein − soprano sax solo (7)
 Chris De'Margary − flute, saxophone
 Kevin Robinson − flugelhorn, trumpet, backing vocals
 Annick Clarisse − backing vocals
 Veronique Clarisse − backing vocals
 Dee Johnson − backing vocals

Production
 Producers – Basia and Danny White
 Live Recording Producer – Louis Larose
 Live Recording Engineer – Randy Ezratty
 Mixed by Steven Venezia at Whitfield Street Recording Studios (London, England), assisted by Jason Scott Westbrook.
 Mastered by Vlado Meller at Sony Music Studios (New York, NY).
 Photography – Paul Cox
 Live Photography – Kevin Mazur
 Management – Dee Anthony and Joshua Simons for BTB Management Group, Inc.

Charts

References

External links
 The official Basia website
 Basia on Broadway on Discogs

1995 live albums
Basia live albums
Epic Records live albums